Nymphaea macrosperma, water lily, is an emergent water plant native to northern Australia.

The water lily occurs in freshwater lagoons, and has large round leaves that float on the water surface.

Uses
The plant is a traditional Aboriginal bushfood. The seeds are usually described as "sweet like a pea" and are eaten for lunch.

References

Bushfood
macrosperma
Angiosperms of Western Australia
Flora of the Northern Territory
Flora of Queensland
Taxa named by Elmer Drew Merrill
Taxa named by Lily May Perry